NCH may refer to:

 IATA airport code for Nachingwea Airport 
 National Children's Home (now Action for Children), a children's charity in the United Kingdom
 National Concert Hall, in Dublin, Ireland
 National Council for Homeopathy, Pakistan
 National Corvette Homecoming, an annual Chevrolet event
 NCH Corporation, American industrial supply company
 NCH Software, Australia 
 New College of the Humanities, now Northeastern University – London, England
 Nicoll Highway MRT station, Singapore
 Northwest Community Hospital in Arlington Heights, Illinois